KARL (105.1 FM) is a radio station broadcasting a Classic Country format in Marshall, Minnesota (licensed to Tracy). The station is currently owned by Linder Radio Group. It carries Westwood One's "Real Country" music format satellite network, but prior to May 2019, it carried Westwood One's "Hot Country" music format satellite network since its sign-on in 1994.

References

External links
105.1 KARL official website

Radio stations in Minnesota
Country radio stations in the United States
Radio stations established in 1986
1986 establishments in Minnesota